André Herfindal (born 4 May 1977) is a Norwegian former professional footballer who played as a defender.

Born in Bergen, He played two cup-matches for Brann in 1995. His other clubs were Ny-Krohnborg, Sogndal, Åsane and Mandalskameratene. He captained the latter club for a couple of seasons.

In 2000, he scored a goal for Sogndal in the promotion play-offs to the Norwegian Premier League which sent Vålerenga into the Adeccoligaen.

References

External links 
 
 

1977 births
Living people
Footballers from Bergen
Norwegian footballers
Association football defenders
SK Brann players
Sogndal Fotball players
Åsane Fotball players
Mandalskameratene players
Eliteserien players
Norwegian First Division players